Lucas Torró Marset (born 19 July 1994) is a Spanish footballer who plays for La Liga club Osasuna as a midfielder.

Club career

Early career 
Born in Cocentaina, Alicante, Valencian Community, Torró represented mainly Hércules CF and CD Alcoyano as a youth, aside from two other clubs in his native region. On 20 January 2012, while still a youth, he made his professional debut by coming on as a late substitute for Paco Esteban in a 2–2 home draw against UD Almería in the Segunda División. On 23 May he appeared in his second match, again from the bench in a 0–5 home loss against former club Hércules; he was also sent off during the match.

Real Madrid 
In August 2012 Torró moved to Real Madrid for a fee of €100,000 with additional clauses based on his progression; it was also Alcoyano's most profitable transfer of its history. Initially assigned to the Juvenil squad, he was promoted to the reserves midway through the season.

Real Oviedo (loan) 
On 18 July 2016 Torró was loaned to Real Oviedo in the second tier, for one year.

Osasuna 
The following 6 July, he signed a three-year deal with CA Osasuna after his contract with Real Madrid expired.

Eintracht Frankfurt 
On 2 July 2018, Osasuna announced that Eintracht Frankfurt would pay Torró's release clause of €1.75 million.

Return to Osasuna 
On 5 August 2020, Torró returned to Osasuna in a transfer deal worth around €2 million. He signed a four-year contract with the club.

International career
In 2013, he played the U19 European Championship in which Spain had a good tournament, being eliminated in the semifinals by France.

Career statistics

Club

References

External links
Real Madrid profile

1994 births
Living people
People from Cocentaina
Sportspeople from the Province of Alicante
Spanish footballers
Footballers from the Valencian Community
Association football midfielders
La Liga players
Segunda División players
Segunda División B players
CD Alcoyano footballers
Real Madrid C footballers
Real Madrid Castilla footballers
Real Oviedo players
CA Osasuna players
Bundesliga players
Eintracht Frankfurt players
Spanish expatriate footballers
Spanish expatriate sportspeople in Germany
Expatriate footballers in Germany
Spain youth international footballers